The 2001 Reading Borough Council election was held on 7 June 2001, at the same time as other local elections across England and Northern Ireland, and on the same day as the general election. One third of the 45 seats on Reading Borough Council were up for election. No seats changed party at the election, and the council therefore continued to have a Labour majority, with David Sutton continuing as leader of the party and the council. The Liberal Democrat leader, Ian Fenwick, led his party into the election, but did not stand for re-election. He was replaced as party leader after the election by Bob Green.

Results

Ward results
The results in each ward were as follows:

References

2001 English local elections
2001